Random42 is a medical animation studio based in central London. It was founded in 1992 by Hugo Paice, focusing primarily on creating animations for the pharmaceutical industry. This has now diversified to a variety of other digital services, including virtual reality, interactive apps, interactive touchscreens, augmented reality as well as booth installations.

Random42 has been listed as one of the fastest-growing companies in the UK pharmaceutical industry, with its inclusion on Alantra's Pharma Fast 50 list in 2018.

The UK Department of International Trade recognizes Random42, who have represented the UK at events all over the world, as one of the leading innovative creative companies in the country.

Clients 

Random42 works with hundreds of pharmaceutical and biotech companies. This includes all of the top 25 pharmaceutical companies as well as new and emerging biotechs. In addition to their core pharma work, they have developed content for consumer health, medical devices, animal health and diagnostics tests, animal health, as well as collaboration with the film industry to develop various documentaries that can be seen in IMAX theatres and streaming services such as Netflix. Their work has been used for the following purposes:

        Promotional content for show and congresses
        Investor relations
        Content for the sales force
        Medical education
        Internal communication

References

External links
 3D Showreel
 Virtual Reality Showreel
 Augmented Reality Showreel

British animation studios